Rodia (formerly Ρογδιά - Rogdia) is a village and a community of Gazi municipal unit in Heraklion regional unit on the island of Crete, Greece.

The community of Rodia is spread on 21.6 km² and encircles following villages and areas:
Rodia, Kapetanaki Metochi, Linoperamata, Pantanassa, Palaiokastro, Savatiana Monastery.

Notes

Populated places in Heraklion (regional unit)